Lime Kiln Creek is a stream within Tulare County in central California. An alternative name for this creek is Dry Creek.

Course
The Lime Kiln Creek headwaters are in the Sierra Nevada and flow into the San Joaquin Valley.  The creek discharges into the Kaweah River near Lemon Cove.

Ecology
The Lime Kiln Creek watershed contains many flora and fauna species. Wildflowers are represented by numerous taxa. They included the yellow mariposa lil], Calochortus luteus.

See also
List of plants of the Sierra Nevada (U.S.)

Line notes

References
 Watson Swartz Clawson. 1967. Pi on the floor, page 58 of 133 pages
 C. Michael Hogan. 2009. Yellow Mariposa Lily: Calochortus luteus, GlobalTwitcher.com, ed. N. Stromberg
 Alfred Louis Kroeber. 1905. Shoshonean dialects of California, Volume 4, 196 pages

Rivers of the Sierra Nevada (United States)
Rivers of Tulare County, California
Sequoia National Forest
Rivers of Northern California
Rivers of the Sierra Nevada in California